The 1949–50 season in Swedish football, starting August 1949 and ending July 1950:

Honours

Official titles

Competitions

Promotions, relegations and qualifications

Promotions

League transfers

Relegations

Domestic results

Allsvenskan 1949–50

Division 2 Nordöstra 1949–50

Division 2 Sydvästra 1949–50

Norrländska Mästerskapet 1950 
Final

Svenska Cupen 1949 
Final

National team results

Notes

References 
Print

Online

 
Seasons in Swedish football